MartyrLoserKing (sometimes stylized as Martyr Loser King) is the fifth solo studio album by Saul Williams. It was released by Fader Label on January 29, 2016. It includes guest appearances from Emily Kokal and Haleek Maul.

Critical reception

At Metacritic, which assigns a weighted average score out of 100 to reviews from mainstream critics, the album received an average score of 78% based on 17 reviews, indicating "generally favorable reviews".

Sam Walker-Smart of Clash gave the album a 7 out of 10, describing it as "a fevered slice of righteous rage moving at breakneck speed, filled to the brim with unsettling production and vivid imaginary." Bekki Bemrose of MusicOMH gave the album 4 stars out of 5, saying, "This collection of songs is a stark contrast to much of the politically neutered output of many contemporary musicians."

Track listing

Charts

References

External links
 
 

2016 albums
Saul Williams albums
Fader Label albums